The Patriotic Society (Russian: Патриотическое общество) was a charity organisation for women, active in Russia from 1812 to 1917. It was the first and most notable women's organisation in Imperial Russia.

References
 Справочная книжка об учреждениях Женского патриотического общества. Петроград, 1915.
Charities based in Russia
Social welfare charities
1812 establishments in the Russian Empire
1917 disestablishments in Russia